Keshan may refer to:

Keshan County, in Heilongjiang, China
Keshan, Heilongjiang, seat of said county
Keşan, town in Eastern Thrace, Turkey
Asb Keshan, village in Kharturan Rural District, Semnan, Iran
Mordar Keshan, village in Central District, Khorasan, Iran
Keshan disease, congestive cardiomyopathy caused by dietary deficiency in the mineral selenium

See also
Kashan
Kashan rug
Qashan